Elephind is a search engine for digitized versions of newspapers from various countries, with the goal of making it possible to search all digitized newspapers from a single website. , 3,600,000 newspapers were accessible on the website, many of them not accessible through Google.

Function 
Elephind is a search engine specifically for digitized versions of historical newspapers, allowing the user to freely search across various newspaper archive websites instead of visiting each individual site. When the user clicks on a search result, they are directed to the online archive where it can be accessed. The collection is international, with newspapers from various countries included.

, 3,600,000 newspapers were accessible on Elephind. Many of the newspapers are on the deep web and cannot be accessed through other search engines such as Google.

Optional registration allows users to bookmark and comment on newspapers.

Elephind uses software from Veridian Software, which was spun out of Greenstone.

References 

Online archives
Digital preservation
Mass digitization
Internet search engines